Jizhou, formerly Ji County, is a district in Hengshui, Hebei Province, China. It shares its name with a province of old, Jizhou or Ji Province, which covered parts of modern-day Hebei, Henan, and Shandong Provinces.

Administrative divisions
Towns:

 Jizhou Town, Weijiatun, Guandaoli, Nanwucun, Zhoucun, Matouli, Xiwangzhuang

Townships:

 Menjiazhuang Township, Xujiazhuang Township, Beizhanghuai Township, Xiaozhai Township

Climate

References

County-level divisions of Hebei
 
Hengshui